Kuznechikha is a rural locality (a village) in Malyginskoye Rural Settlement, Kovrovsky District, Vladimir Oblast, Russia. The population was 81 as of 2010.

Geography 
Kuznechikha is located 8 km northwest of Kovrov (the district's administrative centre) by road. Verkhutikha is the nearest rural locality.

References 

Rural localities in Kovrovsky District